Eudonia bucolica is a moth of the family Crambidae. It is endemic to the Hawaiian islands of Oahu, Molokai, Maui and Hawaii.

The wingspan is 17–21 mm.

The larvae of ssp. bucolica have been recorded feeding on moss.

Subspecies
Eudonia bucolica bucolica (Oahu, Molokai)
Eudonia bucolica macrophanes Meyrick, 1888 (Maui)
Eudonia bucolica pyrseutis Meyrick, 1899 (Hawaii)

External links

Moths described in 1899
Eudonia
Endemic moths of Hawaii